Domanin may refer to:
 Domanín (Hodonín District), Czech Republic
 Domanín (Jindřichův Hradec District), Czech Republic
 Domanin, Kępno County, Poland
 Domanin, Koło County, Poland